Longville is a census-designated place in Beauregard Parish, Louisiana, United States. As of the 2010 census, its population is 635. Longville has four schools: South Beauregard Lower Elementary, South Beauregard Upper Elementary, South Beauregard Junior High, and South Beauregard High School, which are all on one campus.

References

Census-designated places in Louisiana
Census-designated places in Beauregard Parish, Louisiana